James W. Holley (born July 30, 1944) is a Republican member of the Alabama Senate, representing the 31st District since 1998. Previously he was a member of the Alabama House of Representatives from 1974 through 1994. Holley was a Democrat until January 10, 2007, when he announced he would become a Republican.

In May 2019, he voted to make abortion a crime at any stage in a pregnancy, with no exemptions for cases of rape or incest.

References

External links
Alabama State Legislature – Senator Jimmy W. Holley official government website
Follow the Money – Jimmy W Holley
2006 2002 1998 campaign contributions

Republican Party Alabama state senators
1944 births
Living people
American members of the Churches of Christ
Democratic Party members of the Alabama House of Representatives
21st-century American politicians
People from Coffee County, Alabama